China Radio International (CRI) is the state-owned international radio broadcaster of China. It is currently headquartered in the Babaoshan area of Beijing's Shijingshan District. It was founded on December 3, 1941, as Radio Peking. It later adopted the pinyin form Radio Beijing.

CRI states that it "endeavours to promote favourable relations between the PRC and the world" while upholding the PRC's official positions. As with other nations' external broadcasters such as Voice of America, BBC World Service and Radio Australia, CRI claims to "play a significant role in the PRC's soft power strategy" and Go Out policy, aiming to expand the influence of Chinese culture and media in a global stage. CRI attempts to employ new media to compete with other international media. Unlike other broadcasters, CRI's control via indirect majority ownership or financial support of radio stations in various nations is not publicly disclosed.

CRI is presently the international radio arm of the China Media Group, under the control of the Central Propaganda Department of the Chinese Communist Party, created following the first session of the 13th National People's Congress in March 2018.

In February 2020, the United States Department of State designed CRI and other Chinese state-owned media outlets as foreign missions.

History 

Radio was first introduced in China in the 1920s and 1930s. However, few households had radio receivers. A few cities had commercial stations. Most usage of radio was for political purpose, frequently on a local area level.

The Chinese Communist Party first used radio in Yanan Shaanxi Province in March 1940 with a transmitter imported from Moscow. Xinhua New Chinese Radio (XNCR) went on the air from Yanan on December 30, 1940. XNCR transmitted to a larger geographical area after 1945, and its programs became more regular and formalised with broadcasts of news, official announcements, war bulletins, and art and literary programs.

The English service started on September 11, 1947, transmitting as XNCR from a cave in Shahe in the Taihang Mountains, when China was in the midst of a civil war, to announce newly conquered areas and broadcast a Chinese political and cultural perspective to the world at large. The station moved from the Taihang Mountains to the capital, Peking, when The People's Republic of China was formed in 1949. Its name was changed to Radio Peking on April 10, 1950, and to Radio Beijing in 1983. On January 1, 1993, the name of the station was again changed, this time to China Radio International, in order to avoid any confusion with local Beijing radio broadcasting. Its online broadcasting platform: China International Broadcasting Network (CIBN) was formally established in 2011, as a joint venture of China Radio International, Huawen Media Investment, JinZhengYuan, Youku, Oriental Times Media and Suning Holdings Group.

Programming

Mandarin radio channels

At the beginning of 1984, it started to broadcast home service to the Beijing area on AM and FM frequencies. The service later expanded to dozens of major cities across the PRC, providing listeners inside the PRC with timely news and reports, music, weather, English and Chinese learning skills, as well as other services.

CRI News Radio (90.5 FM)

CRI News Radio (CRI环球资讯广播) was established on 28 September 2005, which takes advantage of CRI's journalists from all around the world and reports international (and partially domestic) news, sport, entertainment and lifestyle programmes for domestic listeners in Mandarin Chinese. Its aim is to make CRI News Radio a first-class national news radio brand and its slogans are 'First News, News First', 'On-the-Spot China, Live World' etc.
CRI News Radio can be heard online and in Beijing on the radio on 90.5 FM; in Tianjin 90.6 FM; in Chongqing 91.7 FM; in Guangdong, Hong Kong, and Macau 107.1 FM; in Shandong 89.8 FM; in Anhui 90.1 FM.

Popular Shows
 Laowai's Viewpoint, an international news program with three hosts from different countries, frequent hosts include: Peter Yu (Chinese), Julien Gaudfroy (French), Elyse Ribbons (American), Li Xin (Chinese), and Soojin Zhao (Korean). 
 Bianzou Biankan, a travel show dedicated to a new location every episode
 New Wealth Times, a financial talk show

Chinese podcasts
The following programmes can be heard on the Mandarin version of the podcast from the World Radio Network:
 News, which comes from the Xinhua News Agency.
 Tángrénjiē, a programme about overseas Chinese
 Weather forecasts around China
 Sports

This broadcast was originally targeted at London in the United Kingdom. In 2006, they removed the "London" reference, which was part of the introduction as "Ni hao London. Hello London"

English radio channels

CRI in English (846 AM, 1008 AM; 91.5 FM)
The CRI English channels that can be heard online are:
 CGTN Radio (846 & 1008 AM in Beijing)
 EZFM (also known as Easy FM)
 Round the Clock (Internet only)
 Voices from Other Lands is a weekly English radio program featuring entrepreneurs who originated outside of China doing business in China, hosted by Guanny Liu.
 CRI 91.9 FM (Kenya 91.9 FM)
 Chinese Studio is a 5-minute segment that follows most CRI English programmes
 China Drive is an English radio show about life in the PRC
 CRI Sri Lanka FM 97.9 in Sri Lanka in Sinhala and English (05:00—00:00 Sri Lanka Time)

English Podcasts
CRI offers a list of podcast programs in English:

 Hourly News
 The Beijing Hour 
RoundTable
 Studio Plus
 Today
 Chinese Studio
More to Read

Holiday Broadcasts

During major Chinese holidays (dubbed Golden Week), such as Chinese New Year, May Day, and Mid-Autumn Festival, China Radio International typically broadcasts special programmes such as:
 Growing Up In China (during the May Day holiday)

Most of these programmes are not typical of the broadcast during the other parts of the year. The analogy is similar to Christmas music broadcasts in the United States.

Olympic Radio
In July 2006, CRI launched a new radio station called CRI Olympic Radio at 900 AM in Beijing. This special broadcast was done in Mandarin, Korean, English, Russian, French, Spanish, Arabic, Japanese and German 24 hours a day. This service was terminated in late 2008 after the Beijing Olympics and now the frequency 900 AM is occupied by CRI News Radio which only covers Beijing.

Pay television channels
Other than radio channels, CRI also operates these pay television channels via satellite airing:
 Shark Shopping Channel (聚鲨环球精选) (de facto free channel in several local DTV networks)
 Global Sightseeing Channel (环球奇观)
 China Transport Channel (中国交通) (co-operate with MOT)

Languages
China Radio International broadcasts in the following languages:

The Tibetan, Uygur and Kazakh services are broadcast in association with local radio stations (Tibet People's Broadcasting Station and Xinjiang People's Broadcasting Station).

Joint ventures

China International Broadcasting Network

GBTimes 
CRI owns 60% of Finland-based GBTimes. GBTimes is headed by Zhao Yinong and operates radio stations across Europe that broadcast CRI-produced content.

See also 

 China Media Group ("Voice of China")
 China National Radio
 China Central Television
 China Global Television Network
 International broadcasting
 Radio Taiwan International (formerly "Voice of Free China")

References

Citations

Sources 

 Bishop, Robert L., "Qi Lai! Mobilizing One Billion Chinese: The Chinese Communication System", Ames, Iowa: Iowa State University Press, 1989. 
 Chang, Won Ho, "Mass Media in China: The History and the Future", Ames, Iowa: Iowa State University Press, 1989.
 Hamm, Charles, "Music and Radio in the PRC," Asian Music, Spring/Summer 1991, vXXII, n2, p. 28-29.
 Howkins, John, "Mass Communication in China", New York, NY: Annenberg/ Longman Communication Books, 1982.

External links
 
 

 
Chinese-language radio stations
Mandarin-language radio stations
Tibetan-language radio stations
Communist propaganda
Multilingual news services
Radio stations established in 1941
Mass media in Beijing
International broadcasters
Shortwave radio stations
Multilingual broadcasters
Disinformation operations
1941 establishments in China
Conspiracist media
Uyghur genocide denial